Leonard Thomas Ramsell (20 August 1897 – 24 December 1975) was an English footballer who played in the Football League for Gillingham as an inside left.

Personal life 
In July 1930, Richmond took over the license of the Ye Olde Anchor pub in Twickenham.

Career statistics

References 

English footballers
English Football League players
Chatham Town F.C. players
Gillingham F.C. players
Association football inside forwards
1897 births
1975 deaths
People from Gillingham, Kent
Brentford F.C. players
Publicans